In Old Norse,  (sometimes anglicized as seidhr, seidh, seidr, seithr, seith, or seid) was a type of magic which was practised in Norse society during the Late Scandinavian Iron Age. Connected to the Old Norse religion, its origins are largely unknown, and the practice of it gradually declined after the Christianization of Scandinavia. Accounts of  later made it into sagas and other literary sources, while further evidence of it has been unearthed by archaeologists.

In many cases these magical practitioners would have had assistants to aid them in their rituals.

In pre-Christian Norse mythology,  was associated with both the god Óðinn, a deity who was simultaneously responsible for war, poetry and sorcery, and the goddess Freyja, a member of the Vanir who was believed to have taught the practice to the Æsir.

In the 20th century, adherents of various modern Pagan new religious movements adopted forms of magico-religious practice which include . The practices of these contemporary -workers have since been investigated by various academic researchers who are operating in the field of pagan studies.

[:in german]
s_ey_d_-R(:altnordisch): von s_ê_t_-u/-R(:später):
"setz_-en": 
etwas fest-setz-en, ein-setz-en, usw.; etwas be-setz-en; sitz-en > Sitz, Sitz-er/Besitzer 
(:> english:sett(l)-er)
+ etwas be-sitz-en

Terminology and etymology

 is believed to come from Proto-Germanic *, cognate with Lithuanian , 'tie, tether' and Proto-Celtic * 'sorcery' (giving Welsh , Breton  'magic'), all derived from Proto-Indo-European * 'string, rope', ultimately from the Proto-Indo-European root * 'to bind'.

Related words in Old High German (see German Saite, used both in string instruments and in bows) and Old English refer to 'cord, string,' or 'snare, cord, halter' and there is a line in verse 15 of the skaldic poem Ragnarsdrápa that uses  in that sense. However, if  involved "spinning charms", that would explain the distaff, a tool used in spinning flax or sometimes wool, that appears to be associated with  practice. In any case, the string relates to the "threads of fate", that the Nornir spin, measure, and cut.

Old Norse literature

Freyja and perhaps some of the other goddesses of Norse mythology were  practitioners, Óðinn was accused by Loki in the Lokasenna of being "unmanly" to which Odin replied with: "Knowest thou that I gave
to those I ought not –
victory to cowards?
Thou was eight winters
on the earth below,
milked cow as a woman,
and didst there bear children.
Now that, methinks, betokens a base nature."

Sagas

Erik the Red
She wore a blue cloak and a headpiece of black lamb trimmed with white ermine, carried the symbolic distaff, which was buried with her, and would sit on a high platform. As related in the saga:

Other sagas
As described by Snorri Sturluson in his Ynglinga saga,  includes both divination and manipulative magic. It seems likely that the type of divination of -practitioners was generally distinct, by dint of an altogether more metaphysical nature, from the day-to-day auguries performed by the seers.

However, in chapter 44 of the Icelandic saga Vatnsdæla saga, Þórdís Spákona loans someone her black cloak and stick for magic. The stick is used to strike a man three times on his left cheek to make him forget and three times on his right cheek to make him remember.

Practices
Price noted that, because of its connection with ergi,  was undoubtedly located on 'one of society's moral and psychological borders'.  involved the incantation of spells (galdrar, sing. ).

Practitioners may have been religious leaders of the Viking community and usually required the help of other practitioners to invoke their deities, gods or spirits. As they are described in a number of other Scandinavian sagas, Saga of Erik the Red in particular, the practitioners connected with the spiritual realm through chanting and prayer. Viking texts suggest that the  ritual was used in times of inherent crisis, as a tool for seeing into the future, and for cursing and hexing one's enemies. With that said, it could have been used for great good or destructive evil, as well as for daily guidance.

One author, Neil Price, argues that it was very likely that some parts of the practice involved sexual acts.  Scholars have highlighted that the staffs have phallic epithets in various Icelandic sagas.

Mythology

Óðinn and 

British archaeologist Neil Price noted that "the realm of sorcery" was present in Óðinn's many aspects.

In Lokasenna, according to the Poetic Edda, Loki accuses Óðinn of practising , condemning it as an unmanly art.

Freyja and 

"Njǫrðr’s daughter was Freyja. She presided over the sacrifice.

Origins
However, Indo-European origins are also possible. Note that the Finnish word  and the Sami variants of the term  refer to a human-shaped tree or a large and strangely-shaped stone or rock and do not necessarily reference magical power.

and gender roles in Norse society 
Strength and courage are traditionally manly qualities that were highly valued in Old Norse societies. This is exemplified in the attitudes surrounding  and its place as a feminine craft.

A woman practicing  would sometimes be called völva, meaning seeress. Because  was viewed as a feminine practice, any man who engaged in it was associated with a concept called ergi, the designation of a man in Norse society who was unmanly, feminine and possibly homosexual.

Sometimes, female practitioners of the craft would take on young male apprentices, and those who became mothers would teach the practice to their sons. Though not seen as a respectable thing, it was not rare for men to be involved in  magic.

Contemporary Paganism
Contemporary Paganism, also referred to as Neo-Paganism, is an umbrella term used to identify a wide variety of new religious movements, particularly those influenced by the various pagan beliefs of premodern Europe. Several of these contemporary pagan religions draw specifically on the original mediaeval religious beliefs and practices of Anglo-Saxon England as sources of inspiration, adopting such Anglo-Saxon deities as their own.

 is interpreted differently by different groups and practitioners, but usually taken to indicate altered consciousness or even total loss of physical control. Author Jan Fries regards  as a form of "shamanic trembling", which he relates to "seething", used as a shamanic technique, the idea being his own and developed through experimentation. According to Blain,  is an intrinsic part of spiritual practice connecting practitioners to the wider cosmology in British Germanic Neopaganism.

References

Footnotes

Bibliography

Academic books and papers 
 
 
  Ch. 6.
 Gardela, Leszek. Into Viking Minds: Reinterpreting the Staffs of Sorcery and Unraveling Seidr. Brepols Publishers, 2009.

Non-academic sources 
 

European shamanism
Germanic paganism
Witchcraft in Iceland
Witchcraft in Denmark
Witchcraft in Norway
Witchcraft in Sweden
Iron Age Scandinavia